Matt Iseman (born January 22, 1971) is an American comedian, actor, and television host, who began his career as a physician. He is best known for his role as play-by-play announcer and host of American Ninja Warrior. He was the winner of The New Celebrity Apprentice in 2017, the show's only season.

Early life and medical career 
Iseman was born in Denver, Colorado. The son of a pulmonologist, Iseman was raised in Denver and followed his father into a medical career, earning a B.A. with honors from Princeton University and an M.D. from Columbia University College of Physicians and Surgeons. Iseman is of Ashkenazi Jewish, Irish, Danish, and English descent. He did his internship and residency in internal medicine at the University of Colorado Hospital in his hometown of Denver, and later relocated to the Los Angeles area.

Comedy career
Iseman began doing stand-up comedy, with a routine based partly on his experiences as a doctor. He worked with the improvisational comedy troupe The Groundlings, and in  2002 became a full-time professional comedian. In addition to comedy club work, Iseman's medical background has led to performing for medical and health-related organizations. He has performed at USO shows in Afghanistan, South Korea, Bosnia, and Hungary.

He cites Brian Regan as a comedy inspiration. Iseman's comedy outside of humor about medicine and medical profession is mainly observational, and he generally avoids off-color material.

Television work 
Iseman has hosted the game shows Scream Play on E! and Casino Night on GSN.  He appears as a regular cast member on the home makeover show Clean House and its companion outtakes show, Clean House Comes Clean, both on the Style Network. Additionally, he has hosted 13 out of 14 seasons of American Ninja Warrior on the channel G4, and then on the NBC network. The only season he did not host was season 1. Iseman began working with American Ninja Warrior in 2010. He uses his athleticism and work as a comedian to add his style to the show with Akbar Gbaja-Biamila (former NFL player), and Zuri Hall (sideline correspondent).

He also has worked episodically in television shows including The Drew Carey Show, NCIS, and General Hospital.  He has appeared on the syndicated MAD TV, Comedy Central's Premium Blend, Fox's The Best Damn Sports Show Period, and Fox News Channel's Red Eye w/ Greg Gutfeld. He was the narrator of Dumbest Stuff On Wheels on SPEED. As of May 4, 2010, Iseman is the host of Sports Soup, a spin-off of E!'s The Soup, on Versus.

Iseman won the 15th overall season and first run of The New Celebrity Apprentice and appeared as one of the contestants in the third episode of RuPaul's Secret Celebrity Drag Race to raise funds for the Arthritis Foundation.

Iseman is the new host of Live Rescue on A&E, taking over for former host Ashleigh Banfield.

Personal life
Iseman was diagnosed with rheumatoid arthritis in 2002, at age 31. His disease is being treated successfully.

Iseman is a cancer survivor. In 2018, he wrote on his Instagram account that he had part of a kidney removed due to cancer more than 10 years earlier.

Selected filmography

Television

As actor

As himself

Video game

References

External links 
 
 
 Headliners with...Clean House's Matt Iseman, EntertainmentVine.com, 9 October 2007.

1971 births
American male comedians
21st-century American comedians
Physicians from California
American male television actors
Columbia University Vagelos College of Physicians and Surgeons alumni
Living people
Princeton University alumni
Physicians from Colorado
Male actors from Denver
Participants in American reality television series
The Apprentice (franchise) winners